Gang Mills is a hamlet (and census-designated place) in Steuben County, New York. The population was 4,185 at the 2010 census.

Gang Mills is  located in the town of Erwin, southwest of Corning. During the mid 1800s, it was the site of gang-saw mills to cut lumber.

Geography
Gang Mills is located at  (42.149649, -77.119346).

The community is located next to the Tioga River on U.S. Route 15.

Demographics

As of the 2000 census, there were 3,304 people, 1,279 households, and 868 families residing in Gang Mills. The population density was 506.0 per square mile (195.4/km2). There were 1,374 housing units at an average density of 210.4/sq mi (81.2/km2). The racial makeup of the CDP was 87.05% White, 3.66% African American, 0.15% Native American, 8.05% Asian, 0.15% from other races, and 0.94% from two or more races. Hispanic or Latino of any race were 1.57% of the population.

There were 1,279 households, out of which 37.9% had children under the age of 18 living with them, 55.0% were married couples living together, 9.9% had a female householder with no husband present, and 32.1% were non-families. 28.9% of all households were made up of individuals, and 13.1% had someone living alone who was 65 years of age or older. The average household size was 2.48 and the average family size was 3.08.

In the CDP, the population was spread out, with 27.7% under the age of 18, 5.8% from 18 to 24, 28.8% from 25 to 44, 21.9% from 45 to 64, and 15.7% who were 65 years of age or older. The median age was 38 years. For every 100 females, there were 92.2 males. For every 100 females age 18 and over, there were 85.5 males.

The median income for a household in the CDP was $51,473, and the median income for a family was $68,611. Males had a median income of $54,922 versus $30,174 for females. The per capita income for the CDP was $31,209. About 6.8% of families and 8.3% of the population were below the poverty line, including 10.9% of those under age 18 and 3.1% of those age 65 or over.

Education
Gang Mills is part of the Corning-Painted Post School district.

See also

 List of census-designated places in New York (state)

References

External links

Census-designated places in New York (state)
Census-designated places in Steuben County, New York
Hamlets in New York (state)
Hamlets in Steuben County, New York